Aitor González Jiménez (born 27 February 1975) is a Spanish former professional road bicycle racer, who rode professionally between 1998 and 2005, and was the winner of the 2002 Vuelta a España.

Career
Born in Zumárraga, Gipuzkoa, González turned professional in 1998 with Avianca–Telecom. He won the 2002 Vuelta a España with  after attacking his teammate leading the race; he also won three stages during the race. He also won two stages at the 2002 Giro d'Italia, one at the 2003 Giro d'Italia and one at the 2004 Tour de France. He won the 2005 Tour de Suisse, before he retired in January 2006 after being tested positive for methyltestosterone metabolite twice during the 2005 season. He was also linked with the Operación Puerto doping case.

Post-cycling
After retirement, González had several run-ins with the law. In 2007, he was arrested for driving under the influence of alcohol and cocaine. In 2008, a second arrest followed when he allegedly hired people to beat up a person who owed him money. In 2011, González was again arrested for taking part in a bank fraud. Lastly, in 2016, he was taken into custody a fourth time, for allegedly taking part in a robbery.

Career achievements

Major results

2000
 1st Stage 2 Volta ao Algarve
 2nd Gran Premio de Llodio
 5th Overall Tour du Limousin
1st  Young rider classification 
1st Stage 3
 5th Subida a Urkiola
 6th Overall Tour de Pologne
2001
 1st  Overall Vuelta a Murcia
1st  Points classification
1st Stage 5 (ITT)
 4th Overall Volta a Catalunya
 4th Gran Premio de Llodio
 9th Overall Critérium International
 9th Overall Volta ao Algarve
2002
 1st  Overall Vuelta a España
1st Stages 8, 10 (ITT) & 21 (ITT)
 6th Overall Giro d'Italia
1st Stages 8 & 19 (ITT)
 6th Overall Critérium International
 7th Time trial, UCI Road World Championships
 8th Overall Tour de Romandie
2003
 1st Giro della Provincia di Reggio Calabria
 1st Stage 15 (ITT) Giro d'Italia
2004
 1st Stage 14 Tour de France
 6th Time trial, National Road Championships
2005
 1st  Overall Tour de Suisse
1st Stage 9
 5th Overall Euskal Bizikleta

Grand Tour general classification results timeline

See also
List of riders with stage wins at all three cycling Grand Tours
List of doping cases in cycling
List of sportspeople sanctioned for doping offences

References

External links
 

1975 births
Living people
People from Goierri
Cyclists from the Basque Country (autonomous community)
Spanish Tour de France stage winners
Vuelta a España winners
Spanish Vuelta a España stage winners
Spanish Giro d'Italia stage winners
Doping cases in cycling
Spanish sportspeople in doping cases
Tour de Suisse stage winners
Spanish male cyclists
Sportspeople from Gipuzkoa